MCIT can mean: 
Methylchloroisothiazolinone
Ministry of Communications and Information Technology
 Mobile Crisis Intervention Team